is a Japanese manga series written by Joumyaku and illustrated by Mizuki Yoda. It has been serialized for free on the mobile app and website of Shueisha's online magazine Shōnen Jump+ since April 2022. Shueisha also publishes the series in English on the online platform and mobile app Manga Plus.

Plot summary
Hikaru Gero is a young man from the Poison Clan of professional assassins, which has been in existence for hundreds of years. Because he deals in the dark side of society and has never lived a "normal life", he considers himself to have no prospects with women and has no interest in marriage. However, one day, the Poison Clan states that if Gero does not marry and produce an heir to carry on their lineage, they will force his sister into bearing a child against her wishes. Wanting to save his younger sister from such a fate, Gero asks one of his assassination targets to marry him. When the cross-dressing marriage swindler Mei Kinosaki declines, Gero instead has Kinosaki train him to date and how to appeal to women with the goal of finding someone he truly wants to marry.

Publication 
Marriagetoxin is written by Joumyaku and illustrated by Mizuki Yoda. The manga was officially announced by Shueisha's online magazine Shōnen Jump+ on April 11, 2022, and began its weekly serialization for free on the Shōnen Jump+ mobile app and website on the 20th of the same month. Shueisha also simultaneously publishes the series in English for free on the online platform and mobile app Manga Plus.

Volume list

Chapters not yet in tankōbon format 
These chapters have yet to be published in a tankōbon volume.

 Chapters 26–36
 Bonus Chapters 4–6

Reception 
Marriagetoxin was nominated for the Next Manga Award in the Best Web Manga category in June 2022, and ranked eighth out of 50 nominees. It also ranked fifth in the Nationwide Publishers Recommended Comics of 2023.

References

External links 
  
 
 

2020s LGBT literature
Action anime and manga
Cross-dressing in anime and manga
Fictional assassins in comics
Japanese webcomics
LGBT in anime and manga
Organized crime in anime and manga
Romantic comedy anime and manga
Shōnen manga
Shueisha manga
Webcomics in print